The 7th Television State Awards festival (Sinhala: 7 වැනි රූපවාහිනී රාජ්‍ය සම්මාන උලෙළ), was held to honor the television programs of 2009 Sinhala television on January 20, 2010, at the Bandaranaike Memorial International Conference Hall, Colombo 07, Sri Lanka. The event was organized by the Ministry of Culture and the Arts, State Television Advisory Council and Arts Council of Sri Lanka. The Prime Minister of Sri Lanka D. M. Jayaratne was the chief guest.

At the award ceremony, veteran actress Iranganie Serasinghe received the Lifetime Achievement Award.

Awards

Media Section

Television Serial Section

References

Sri Lankan Television State Awards
Sri Lankan Television State Awards